Menashe Business Mercantile Ltd. & Anor v William Hill Organization Ltd. [2002] EWCA Civ 1702 was a patent case regarding Internet usage. The case addressed a European patent covering the United Kingdom for an invention referred to as "Interactive, computerized gaming system with remote control". Menashe sued William Hill, claiming that William Hill was infringing the patent by operating an online gaming system. William Hill's defence argued that it did not infringe the patent because the server on which it operated the system was located outside of the UK, in Antigua or Curaçao. Although accepting that their supply of software was in the UK and that this was an essential part of the invention, they further argued that the patent was for the parts of the system, and as one essential part of the system was not located in the UK, there could be no infringement.

This aspect of William Hill's case was tried at a preliminary issue before Mr. Justice Jacob in the High Court in 2002. Mr. Justice Jacob found against William Hill holding that the patent related to the entire system, being the sum of all its elements. Simply locating one part of the system abroad did not prevent infringement when the result was still providing UK punters with the system's benefits.

The Court's ruling took a broad interpretation, concentrating on the spirit and intention of patent protection and not confining itself to the linguistic construction of the law which developed before the advent of the Internet.

Lord Justice Aldous heard the appeal and while he maintained the result of the judgment of the Patents Court, the reasoning was very different and was based upon where the invention was being "used". The claimed invention required there to be a host or server computer. According to the judgment, it did not matter where the host computer was situated. It could be in the United Kingdom, on a satellite, or even on the border between two countries. Its location was not important to the user of the invention nor to the claimed gaming system. In that respect, there was a real difference between the claimed gaming system and an ordinary machine. The judge therefore believed that it would be wrong to apply the old ideas of location to inventions of the type under consideration. A person who is situated in the United Kingdom who obtains in the United Kingdom a CD and then uses his terminal to address a host computer is not bothered where the host computer is located. It is of no relevance to him, the user, nor the patentee as to whether or not it is situated in the United Kingdom.

If the host computer is situated in Antigua and the terminal computer is in the United Kingdom, it is pertinent to ask who uses the claimed gaming system. The answer must be the punter. Where does he use it? There can be no doubt that he uses his terminal in the United Kingdom and it is not a misuse of language to say that he uses the host computer in the United Kingdom. It is the input to and output of the host computer that is important to the punter and in a real sense the punter uses the host computer in the United Kingdom even though it is situated in Antigua and operates in Antigua. In those circumstances it is not straining the word "use" to conclude that the United Kingdom punter will use the claimed gaming system in the United Kingdom, even if the host computer is situated in, say, Antigua. Thus the supply of the CD in the United Kingdom to the United Kingdom punter will be intended to put the invention into effect in the United Kingdom.

See also
 Software patents under United Kingdom patent law

External links
 Full Text of Judgements on BAILII:
 First Instance: 
 Appeal: 

United Kingdom patent case law
Court of Appeal (England and Wales) cases
2002 in case law
2002 in British law
William Hill (bookmaker)